Edvard Haga (19 October 1893, Vörå - 21 January 1968) was a Finnish farmer, bank director and politician. He was a member of the Parliament of Finland from 1929 to 1944, representing the Swedish People's Party of Finland.

References

1893 births
1968 deaths
People from Vörå
People from Vaasa Province (Grand Duchy of Finland)
Swedish People's Party of Finland politicians
Members of the Parliament of Finland (1929–30)
Members of the Parliament of Finland (1930–33)
Members of the Parliament of Finland (1933–36)
Members of the Parliament of Finland (1936–39)
Members of the Parliament of Finland (1939–45)
Finnish people of World War II